Adam Mohamed Ounas (born 11 November 1996) is a professional footballer who plays as a winger or attacking midfielder for  club Lille. Born in France, he plays for the Algeria national team.

Club career

Early career
Ounas was four years old when he joined the local club Tours encouraged by his father, a former goalkeeper, Hadji Ounas. He played for Tours for ten years before joining the U14 youth team of Châteauroux.

One year later, due to juvenile mistakes, he left Châteauroux and played for a small local club, Football Club Ouest Tourangeau 37, where Arnaud Vaillant, scout for Bordeaux and Yannick Stopyra discovered him.

Bordeaux
In April 2013, Ounas joined Bordeaux on a one-year contract and in April 2014, he signed a two-year trainee contract.

Ounas made his first-team debut for Bordeaux on 4 October 2015, being introduced in the 72nd minute and scoring the last goal in his club's 3–2 defeat away to Lorient. He started in the following match against Montpellier, before being substituted in the 59th minute, and was introduced in the 77th minute of Bordeaux's 0–1 defeat to Sion in the Europa League on 22 October. On 25 October, Ounas scored his second Ligue 1 goal 11 minutes after having come on in the 67th minute, helping his club to a 1–0 win over Troyes AC. In December, Bordeaux rewarded him with a professional contract running until June 2019.

Napoli
On 3 July 2017, Napoli confirmed the signing of Ounas from Bordeaux. He scored his first goal for the club in a 1–3 loss to RB Leipzig in the Europa League 1st knockout round first leg.

Loan to Nice 
On 30 August 2019, Ounas moved to Ligue 1 side OGC Nice, on a loan deal with a purchase option. On 6 May 2020, Nice decided not to trigger the purchase option and Ounas returned to Napoli.

Loan to Cagliari 
On 6 October 2020, Ounas joined Serie A side Cagliari on a season-long loan with an option to buy. On 28 January 2021, Ounas parted ways with Cagliari due to lack of playing time.

Loan to Crotone 
On 1 February 2021, Ounas joined Italian club Crotone on a loan deal. He scored his first goal for the Club on 14 February in a 2-1 home loss to Sassuolo. His second marker came against Torino on 7 March; following the match, he became the target of cyber racism, allegedly from Torino fans, which included direct messages on Instagram, of which he published screenshots, calling him a "monkey", telling him to "return to Africa", and even hoping for his death.

Lille
On 1 September 2022, Ounas signed with Lille for two seasons, with an option for a third season.

International career
Born in France to Algerian parents, Ounas is eligible to represent both countries internationally. After initially playing for the France under-20 team, he opted to change his allegiance to Algeria in October 2016. Shortly after the switch, Ounas was called up to the Algeria national team for the first time for a 2018 World Cup qualifier against Nigeria.

Ounas made his debut for the senior Algeria in a 1–0 2018 FIFA World Cup qualification loss to Zambia on 5 September 2017.

Ounas opened his scoring record For Algeria on 1 July 2019, scoring twice against Tanzania in a 3–0 victory in the Africa Cup of Nations.

Career statistics

Club

International

Scores and results list Algeria's goal tally first, score column indicates score after each Ounas goal.

Honours
Algeria
 Africa Cup of Nations: 2019

References

External links
 

1996 births
People from Chambray-lès-Tours
Sportspeople from Indre-et-Loire
Footballers from Centre-Val de Loire
Living people
Algerian footballers
Algeria international footballers
French footballers
France youth international footballers
French sportspeople of Algerian descent
Association football midfielders
Ligue 1 players
Serie A players
2019 Africa Cup of Nations players
FC Girondins de Bordeaux players
S.S.C. Napoli players
OGC Nice players
Cagliari Calcio players
F.C. Crotone players
Lille OSC players
Algerian expatriate footballers
Expatriate footballers in Italy
Algerian expatriate sportspeople in Italy